The fourth season of the American animated television series SpongeBob SquarePants, created by former marine biologist and animator Stephen Hillenburg, aired on Nickelodeon from May 6, 2005, to July 24, 2007, and contained 20 half-hour episodes. The series chronicles the exploits and adventures of the title character and his various friends in the fictional underwater city of Bikini Bottom. The season was executive produced by series creator Hillenburg, while writer Paul Tibbitt acted as the supervising producer and showrunner. The show underwent a hiatus on television as Hillenburg halted the production in 2002 to work on the film adaptation of the series, The SpongeBob SquarePants Movie. Once the film was finalized and the previous season had completed broadcast on television, Hillenburg wanted to end the show, but the success of the series led to more episodes, so Tibbitt took over Hillenburg's position as showrunner and began working on a fourth season for broadcast in 2005. Hillenburg remained with the show, but in a smaller advisory role in which he reviewed each episode and offered suggestions to the show's production crew.

The show itself received several recognition, including the three Kids' Choice Awards for Favorite Cartoon from 2005 to 2007. "Fear of a Krabby Patty" and "Shell of a Man" were nominated at the 57th Primetime Emmy Awards for Outstanding Animated Program (for Programming Less Than One Hour). It also received a nomination for "Bummer Vacation" and "Wigstruck" at the 59th Primetime Emmy Awards for the same category. 

Several compilation DVDs that contained episodes from the season were released. The SpongeBob SquarePants: Season 4, Volume 1 and 2 DVDs were released in Region 1 on September 12, 2006, and January 9, 2007, respectively, while the complete set was released in Region 2 on November 3, 2008, and Region 4 on November 7, 2008. The second volume was released in Region 1 before several episodes aired in the United States. On November 13, 2012, The Complete Fourth Season DVD was released in Region 1.

Production
The season aired on Nickelodeon, which is owned by Viacom, and was produced by United Plankton Pictures and Nickelodeon Animation Studio. The season's executive producer was series creator Stephen Hillenburg. In 2002, Hillenburg and the show's staff members decided to stop making episodes to work on the 2004 film The SpongeBob SquarePants Movie, after completing the third season. As a result, the show went into a two-year "self-imposed" production hiatus. During the break on television, Nickelodeon expanded the programming for the third season to cover the delay, however, according to network executive Eric Coleman, "there certainly was a delay and a built-up demand." Nickelodeon announced nine "as-yet-unaired" episodes would be shown during the break.

Once the production on the film was completed, Hillenburg wanted to end the series "so the show wouldn't jump the shark", but Nickelodeon wanted to produce more episodes. Hillenburg said "Well, there was concern when we did the movie [in 2004] that the show had peaked. There were concerns among executives at Nickelodeon." Hillenburg resigned as the series' showrunner, and appointed Paul Tibbitt, who previously served as a writer, director, and storyboard artist of the show, to overtake the role. Hillenburg considered Tibbitt one of his favorite members of the show's crew, and "totally trusted him". Tibbitt still helmed the showrunner position, until October 2015 when Vincent Waller and Marc Ceccarelli took his position, and also functions as an executive producer. Hillenburg no longer wrote or directly ran the show on a day-to-day basis, but reviewed each episode and delivered suggestions. He said, "I figure when I'm pretty old I can still paint. I don't know about running shows."

In November 2004, Tom Kenny, Bill Fagerbakke, and the rest of the crew confirmed that they had completed four new episodes for broadcast on Nickelodeon in early 2005, and planned to finish about 20 total for the then-fourth season. In particular, Kenny said, "Kids were happy watching them for the 3,000th time. It was the parents who've been busting my chops for new episodes." He remarked that it would be "the same show, the same sponge". On May 6, 2005, the season premiered with the episodes "Fear of a Krabby Patty" and "Shell of a Man". "Fear of a Krabby Patty" was the first episode to be broadcast after the show's intermission. It was written by C.H. Greenblatt and Paul Tibbitt, while Alan Smart served as animation director.

Animation was handled overseas in South Korea at Rough Draft Studios. Animation directors credited with episodes in the fourth season included Larry Leichliter, Andrew Overtoom, Smart, and Tom Yasumi. Episodes were written by a team of writers, which consisted of Casey Alexander, Steven Banks, Mike Bell, Luke Brookshier, Nate Cash, Zeus Cervas, Greenblatt, Tom King, Tim Hill, Kyle McCulloch, Dani Michaeli, Chris Mitchell, Mike Mitchell, Aaron Springer, Tibbitt, Vincent Waller, Tuck Tucker, and Erik Wiese. The storyboard directors for this season were Alexander, Bell, Brookshier, Cash, Cervas, Greenblatt, King, Chris Mitchell, Springer, Tuck Tucker, Brad Vandergrift, Waller, and Wiese.

Cast

The fourth season featured Tom Kenny as the voice of the title character SpongeBob SquarePants and his pet snail Gary. SpongeBob's best friend, a starfish named Patrick Star, was voiced by Bill Fagerbakke, while Rodger Bumpass played the voice of Squidward Tentacles, an arrogant and ill-tempered octopus. Other members of the cast were Clancy Brown as Mr. Krabs, a miserly crab obsessed with money who is SpongeBob's boss at the Krusty Krab; Mr. Lawrence as Plankton, a small green copepod and Mr. Krabs' business rival; Jill Talley as Karen, Plankton's sentient computer sidekick; Carolyn Lawrence as Sandy Cheeks, a squirrel from Texas; Mary Jo Catlett as Mrs. Puff, SpongeBob's boating school teacher; and Lori Alan as Pearl, a teenage whale who is Mr. Krabs' daughter.

In addition to the regular cast members, episodes feature guest voices from a range of professions, including actors, musicians, and artists. For instance, in the episode "Have You Seen This Snail?", American comedian and actress Amy Poehler guest starred as the voice of Grandma, a sweet old woman who adopted Gary after he ran away. Musician Stew also appeared as a voice, performing the song "Gary, Come Home". Show writer C.H. Greenblatt made an appearance in the episode "Selling Out" as Carl. Ernest Borgnine and Tim Conway returned in the episode "Mermaid Man and Barnacle Boy VI: The Motion Picture", reprising their roles as Mermaid Man and Barnacle Boy, respectively. Brian Doyle-Murray reprised his role as the Flying Dutchman for "Ghost Host". In "Mrs. Puff, You're Fired", English actor Robin Sachs voiced Sergeant Sam Roderick, a driving instructor who took over Mrs. Puff in teaching SpongeBob. Christopher Ryan, Nigel Planer and Rik Mayall appeared in the episode "Chimps Ahoy" as Sandy's bosses—Professor Percy, Dr. Marmalade and Lord Reginald, respectively. In the entry "Karate Island", Happy Days and The Karate Kid actor Pat Morita guest starred as Master Udon, a scammer who kidnaps SpongeBob to make him buy real estate. Morita died on November 24, 2005, from kidney failure at his home in Las Vegas, Nevada, and the May 2006 episode was dedicated to Morita's memory.

Reception
The season was critically acclaimed by media critics and fans. Paul Mavis of DVD Talk gave both of the season's volumes 4½ stars. The episodes "Fear of a Krabby Patty" and "Shell of a Man" were nominated at the 57th Primetime Emmy Awards for Outstanding Animated Program (for Programming Less Than One Hour), but lost to South Parks "Best Friends Forever". The show was also nominated at the 59th Primetime Emmy Awards for the same category for the episodes "Bummer Vacation" and "Wigstruck". At the 33rd Annie Awards, C.H. Greenblatt, Paul Tibbitt, Mike Bell and Tim Hill won for Best Writing in an Animated Television Production for the episode "Fear of a Krabby Patty". "Fear of a Krabby Patty" won for a Special Award at the 2005 Annecy International Animated Film Festival. At the 2006 Golden Reel Awards, the episode "Have You Seen This Snail?" was nominated for Best Sound Editing in Television: Animated. The show itself received several recognitions, including the three Kids' Choice Awards for Favorite Cartoon from 2005 to 2007. It also received a nomination at the 21st TCA Awards for Outstanding Achievement in Children's Programming, but lost to Degrassi: The Next Generation, and at the 23rd TCA Awards for the same category. However, the series did not win.

Episodes

The episodes are ordered below according to Nickelodeon's packaging order, and not their original production or broadcast order.

DVD release
The first ten episodes of the fourth season were released on DVD by Paramount Home Entertainment in the United States and Canada on September 12, 2006. The "Volume 1" DVD release features bonus material including animatics and featurettes. The remaining ten episodes of the season were also released under the title "Volume 2" in the United States and Canada on January 9, 2007. The DVD release also features bonus material including music videos, shorts and featurettes. In Region 2 and 4, the DVD release for the season was a complete set. On November 13, 2012, The Complete Fourth Season DVD was released in Region 1, five years after the season had completed broadcast on television.

Notes

References

External links

 at IMDb
Season 4 at TV.com
Season 4 at Metacritic

2005 American television seasons
2006 American television seasons
2007 American television seasons
SpongeBob SquarePants seasons